Mfantseman is one of the constituencies represented in the Parliament of Ghana. It elects one Member of Parliament (MP) by the first past the post system of election. Mfantseman is located in the South Dayi district  of the Volta Region of Ghana. It was created in 2012 ahead of the 2012 Ghanaian general election.

Boundaries
The constituency is located within the Mfantseman Municipal District of the Central Region of Ghana.

Members of Parliament

Elections

Ekow Hayford the NPP MP for Mfantseman was murdered by armed robbers on the Nkusukum Mankessim-Abeadze Duadze Road on his way from a campaign trip for the 2020 Ghanaian general election. As his death was less than three months before the 2020 election, Article 112 (5) of the 1992 Ghanaian Constitution stipulates that there should not be a by-election in the constituency.

See also
List of Ghana Parliament constituencies

References

External links
Election Passport - American University

Parliamentary constituencies in the Central Region (Ghana)